Brascote is a hamlet forming part of the Newbold Verdon civil parish in the Hinckley and Bosworth district of Leicestershire, England.
 The population is included in the parish of Newbold Verdon.

Among a handful of residences is a pub, named The Windmill. Previous medieval and post medieval settlements on the same site were deserted.

Brascote House, one of the two farms in Brascote was demolished in 2009 to allow for the land beneath to be quarried.

References

External links 
 
 

Former populated places in Leicestershire
Hamlets in Leicestershire
Hinckley and Bosworth